Ryuho Okawa (大川 隆法; Ōkawa Ryūhō; born Takashi Nakagawa (中川 隆; Nakagawa Takashi),  7 July 1956 – 2 March 2023) was a Japanese religious and political leader who was the CEO and founder of the Happy Science and the Happiness Realization Party.

His organization has been widely criticised as a cult.  Adherents of the religion worship Okawa, who claimed to be the current incarnation of a god called "El Cantare" and a number of other beings, including Hermes and Gautama Buddha.

Early life
His older brother is named  (born 1952) (later known as ).

Okawa said his family was religious; both of his parents believed in God and the Buddha, and Okawa believed in the existence of spirits and souls, and a world after death in childhood. Despite his beliefs, Okawa was not active in religious practice. Okawa and Tomiyama were raised in a strict home environment that was ordinary and not particularly rich nor poor.

Yoshikawa is said to be one of the most important influences on Okawa's life. Okawa said, despite not having a spiritual or religious master, Yoshikawa had an important influence. Yoshikawa edited journals for the Japanese Communist Party and later worked as an agricultural advisor in local government. He was deeply interested in spirituality and religion. He studied in the Christian Church as a teenager, as well as in a new religion called Seicho-no-Ie after World War II. He later became a follower of Shinji Takahashi, leader of the religious organization  (GLA). He would also later serve as Happy Science's official adviser in its first few years. Yoshikawa was demanding on Okawa's success. Yoshikawa gave him and Tomiyama hour-long lectures after dinner at home. The lectures included religious topics like the Bible and The Gateless Barrier, as well as secular topics like Kantian philosophy and Marxism during elementary school, although Okawa was not successful in school.

Okawa wanted to be a scholar or a diplomat. He wanted to spread his ideas in academia, or broaden his view on life by experiencing different cultures as a diplomat. Because of this prospect, he started studying until late at night and became amongst the top of his class. He became particularly good at English. He was obese, weighing 60 kg when he was 143 cm tall.

During secondary school, Okawa was an active student. He fished, played tennis, and practiced kendo. He was involved in school activities; he was president of the student union and editor of the school newspaper.

Career

Education
In 1975, Okawa failed the entrance exam for Tokyo University. After studying for a year, he was accepted into the university's Liberal Arts Division. During his first year, he was not socially adjusted. He said he once wrote love letters to a girl, but was rejected. He felt uncomfortable amongst the students who were uninterested in spirituality. During his second year, a time he calls "the first stage in the 'awakening of wisdom'", he modeled his daily schedule after that of Immanuel Kant, whom he respected deeply. At 3 pm, he would take a walk while writing poetry. At 5 pm, he would go to the local bathhouse and stay there for an hour thinking about his day. Going home, he would have a cheap meal, and buy two books at a local bookstore. From 8:30 to 9 pm, he would read, then drink tea, and then read philosophy. The philosophy he read included those of Plato and Kitaro Nishida.

In April 1978, after his second year at university, he majored in politics and studied at the Faculty of Law. After his third year, he paused his studies for a year. At the end of the break, he failed a judicial exam and the exam for higher-level civil servants. In his fourth and last year, his interests started to change from philosophy to metaphysics. He read the works of Shinji Takahashi of GLA and Masaharu Taniguchi of Seicho-no-Ie. After graduating in spring 1981, he took up his job. He was assigned to the foreign exchange department at the headquarters in Tokyo.

Spiritual contacts
On 23 March 1981, before graduating from university and working at TOMEN Corporation, Okawa said he experienced his "Buddha Enlightenment", his first contact with a high divine spirit. This spirit is believed to be that of Nikkō Shōnin, who was one of Nichiren's disciples. On that day, he had a sudden feeling that a person was trying to communicate with him. He grabbed a pencil and a card. His hand started to move on its own, and wrote "良い知らせ、良い知らせ"　(good news, good news). Asking who the person is, his hand signed "日興", the name of Nikkō. A week later, the spirit of Nichiren started contacting Okawa. They then communicated every day from March to July 1981, when he was working at TOMEN. Okawa asked the spirit what mission he should pursue in life. The spirit replied "Love others, nurture others, and forgive others". This message later became the basis of Okawa's teachings about love.

In June 1981, the religious leader Shinji Takahashi's spirit told Okawa his destiny to found a new religion. His father Yoshikawa, upon hearing of this, went to Tokyo, later becoming one of his followers. The next month, the spirits spoke through Okawa, including those of Kūkai, Shinran, Confucius, Jesus Christ, Moses, and Nostradamus. Yoshikawa and Tomiyama taped the communications. The tapes were interviews between the interviewing Yoshikawa and the spirits. Okawa acted as a spiritual medium and answered Yoshikawa's questions. The tapes were transcribed and adapted into publishable formats by Yoshikawa. Yoshikawa's help allowed Okawa to continue working as a businessman at TOMEN Corporation. Without his help, Happy Science could possibly have started differently and at a later date, or even not have been founded at all. The spiritual messages were given to the publisher  because they specialized in spiritual works.

Okawa published a vast number of spiritual messages from various spirits in order to prove the existence of the Spirit World to the public. His first thirteen books, published from 1985 to 1987, consisted of these spiritual messages; the first eight were published from 1985 to 1986 under Yoshikawa's pen name to avoid Okawa's authorship being found out by his employers. The first book, was published on 15 August 1985. Both became best-sellers in Japan in 1991. After 1991, almost all spiritual message books were discontinued aside from the messages of Buddha.

The books of spiritual messages were replaced with newer versions when Okawa started publishing under his own name after the foundation of Happy Science. The new books were akin to collected and revised versions of the originals. They are presented as religious tractates which are divided into chapters, rather than interviews between Yoshikawa and the spirits.

Okawa told his readers to not let foreigners read the spiritual messages and to not translate the messages into English, Chinese, or Korean. He says that foreigners should not know about the messages "until the time is ripe" and that propagating them overseas would "only heighten the fear." Astley (1995) says the real reason Okawa discouraged readers from spreading the messages abroad may be because the messages seem to contain a large amount of plagiarism.

As the spirits continued talking to Okawa, he eventually realized that he is a reincarnation of Guatama Buddha, and the incarnation of the Highest Spiritual Being named El Cantare. Okawa believes that this was revealed to him by the consciousness of Guatama Buddha. This revelation convinced him that his mission was to spread Truth on earth.

Business career
Okawa's life as a businessman went normally despite his communication with the spirits, which continued throughout his business career. In August 1982, Okawa was sent to the company's US headquarters at the World Trade Center in New York for training. He took an English course at Berlitz Language School and he studied international finance at the City University of New York. He dropped out of university after experiencing an intensified inferiority complex from seeing a Taiwanese classmate who spoke fluent English. Around this time, he said he experienced the "second stage in the 'awakening of wisdom'". His inferiority complex went away when he thought about the knowledge he obtained from the over three thousand books he read thus far. In 1983, he returned to Tokyo, and was assigned to work on negotiations with banks. In March 1984, he was sent to Nagoya. By summer of 1985, he had read over four thousand books. Thoughts "spewed forth like water from a spring", and his inferiority complex changed into a sense of superiority.

Okawa earned a particular reputation at his work, where rumours about him spread. His former colleagues said he claimed to see spirits possessing people and offered to exorcise them. In June 1986, high spirits suggested he retire from work, leading him to dedicate his life to religion. On 15 July, he resigned from TOMEN Corporation and on October 6, founded Happy Science and adopted the name "Ryuho Okawa".

Happy Science

Study group
On 6 October 1986, Okawa opened the first office for Happy Science in Suginami, Tokyo, with four staff members. The name "幸福の科学" originates from inspiration that Okawa said he received from Nichiren's spirit; the details were published in Okawa's first book Nichiren no reigen in 1985. At first, the organization presented itself as a "study group on human happiness" and consisted of readers and sympathizers of Okawa's spiritual works, who were friends and acquaintances of Okawa. However, the organization may have intended to be known as a religious body later.

On 23 November 1986, Okawa gave his first sermon to about 80 followers in Tokyo. This date is now known as one of the most important dates in Happy Science's history.

In March 1987, Okawa gave what is known as his first official large public lecture, entitled "The Principles of Happiness", to an audience of about 400 people. In the lecture, he implied that he was a prophet, saying that while spiritual mediums and psychics cannot hear the voice of God, prophets can. He said that a prophet's task is to listen to the voice and spread the word of God. He stated that the early years of Happy Science would consist of study. 

In June 1987, a new series of books, called the  series, launched. The three books are collectively called . They were originally presented as the final revelations of the Buddha. The Laws of the Sun is the first book in which Okawa explained his own point of view and his teachings. While Okawa had published books before, they were all spiritual messages that came from spirits, not Okawa. The book contains "the core of [Happy Science]'s doctrine" and is "the starting point of its salvation movement". The book also contains an account of Okawa's early life. The Golden Laws is dedicated to "time and history in relation to the Truth". The Laws of Eternity focuses on the structure of the spirit world, which The Laws of Sun also covers, but the book explains it in greater detail. Each book in the trilogy has a subtitle which mentions the shaka. The subtitles would be changed in future editions following changes in Happy Science's doctrine.

At the end of 1989, with the publication of The Rebirth of the Buddha, Okawa officially declared that he is an incarnation of Buddha. His teachings were re-interpreted in light of this revelation. The doctrine of Happy Science was interpreted to be fundamentally Buddhist.

Okawa's audience at his lectures grew larger as Happy Science gained new members. The initial audience of 400 at his lecture in 1987 grew to 10,000 by 1990. The organization grew rapidly. In December 1989, the headquarters was moved to one of the most expensive business buildings in Tokyo in Kioichō, Chiyoda, next to Tokyo's main business and political area. The rent was known to be ¥25 million per month.

Religious organization
On 7 March 1991, Happy Science obtained legal status as a 　through the Religious Corporations Law by the Tokyo Metropolitan Government. The group's government recognition allowed it to gradually grow by taking on new members from the general Japanese public. In that year, Happy Science started large-scale festivities. One of these was Okawa's , held on 15 July 1991, just after Okawa's 35th birthday. In the festival, Okawa was in front of an audience of 50,000 people, which included the mass media, in Tokyo Dome. He declared that he now had at least 1.5 million followers and that his real identity is "El Cantare", the Grand Spirit of the Terrestrial Spirit Group, also known as the "Buddha of Mahayana". El Cantare was revealed to have several reincarnations prior to the Buddha and Okawa.

In May 1994, a doctrinal shift occurred. Old publications were revised to reflect the new concept of El Cantare. This included an updated version of the Trilogy of Salvation, which was called the  series. Each book in the trilogy had its subtitle revised, which now refers explicitly to El Cantare's name rather than the shaka as with the original versions. The revised version of The Laws of the Sun contains a different account of Okawa's early life compared to the original version. The new edition also contains a list of El Cantare's previous reincarnations.

Since the founding of Happy Science, Okawa has reportedly published over 500 books, most of which are transcripts of his video recorded lectures. There are 15 films based on his teachings: The Laws of the Sun, The Laws of Eternity, The Golden Laws, The Terrifying Revelations of Nostradamus, Hermes - Winds of Love, The Rebirth of Buddha, The Mystical Laws, The Final Judgement, The Laws of the Universe, I'm Fine My Angel, The World We Live In, and Daybreak.

Organization
Fukui (2004) notes that Okawa's leadership is consistent with sociologist Max Weber's theory about charismatic authority. Okawa's leadership comes from belief in his supernatural traits, as he identifies as the Buddha and El Cantare. Under his authority, Happy Science has undergone rapid changes, including changes in its projects, doctrine, and staff, who do not remain in the same post for a long time. Fukui (2004) says, citing Wallis (1983), that rapid change allows a charismatic leader to stay in power. Rapid change protects the leader from vulnerability stemming from disbelief in their supernatural claims, routinization, or dissenting leaders.

Since its founding, Happy Science has been organized like a secular company. This is reflected in titles of positions, which are secular. Fukui (2004) says, when visiting the headquarters' offices in Tokyo, it was difficult to "tell the difference between [Happy Science]'s offices and those of a business corporation." Most staff members were wearing business suits and doing paperwork at their desks. The usual office equipment are seen as well, such as telephones, fax machines, filing cabinets, photocopiers, and computers. Fukui (2004) says "apart from the presence of the gohonzon (the religious icon of worship) within the office of each division, it felt as though I was visiting a major trading house." "renouncers who have left their secular lives"), they spent a considerable amount of time working in the office.

Happy Science has been widely criticised as a cult.

Role as Buddha and El Cantare
In Happy Science, Okawa is known as the Buddha, both the Enlightened One and the reincarnation of Guatama Buddha, and the embodiment of El Cantare, the Grand Spirit of the Terrestrial Spirit Group, called Lord El Cantare within Happy Science. The name "El Cantare" means "beautiful land of light, Earth". El Cantare is also known as the "Eternal Buddha". This Buddha is related to the Creator God, known as the "Primordial Buddha". Many members believe Okawa is an incarnation of the Creator. Okawa is believed to have many past incarnations. These include a king named La Mu on the continent Mu, a king named Thoth on the continent Atlantis, a king named Rient Arl Croud in the Inca Empire located in ancient South America, Ophealis in archaic Greece, Hermes in ancient Greece, and the Buddha in India.

As El Cantare, Okawa is the main figure of worship in Happy Science. Members have faith in El Cantare. Their worship gives them "comfort, energy, courage, hope, steadiness, and a sense of being guided and looked after." The organization's  has a photo of Okawa as El Cantare. El Cantare is said to have chosen to be incarnated in Japan because both Eastern and Western civilizations are merged there. When the two civilizations coexist harmoniously, an element of the Utopia would be realized. Thus Japan is the ideal place for Okawa to run a utopian movement which will bring about a new age in the 21st century. Okawa said El Cantare has two roles: a Savior, like Amitabha Buddha, and Mahavairocana, the Buddha's essence which represents enlightenment.

El Cantare is believed to be needed in this world because the world is in a crisis. Dark thoughts exist in the world, which cause disasters, including wars and other conflicts. In Happy Science's doctrine, like attracts like; the cultivation of the Light of Buddha attracts more light, and the cultivation of dark thoughts attracts more dark thoughts. Dark thoughts currently outweigh the Light in the world, creating the need for a Utopia which reverses the situation. This Utopia is to be realized by El Cantare and his followers.

Because Okawa identifies as both the Buddha and El Cantare, Fukui (2004) believes that he fits both types of prophet which sociologist Max Weber believes exist: the exemplary type who leads people to salvation through exemplary living and the emissary type who declares their demands to the world. Okawa plays the exemplary role as the Buddha by embodying the correct way of living and by guiding people to enlightenment. Okawa fulfills the emissary role as El Cantare by providing "hopes of salvation."

Publications
A vast amount of literature has been dedicated to Happy Science's doctrine. Okawa said they all have the purpose of learning Happy Science's fundamental scripture, . Okawa's publications come in three different types. One are the books containing spiritual messages from Okawa's communication with various spirits. The second type are transcriptions of Okawa's lectures and seminar-talks. The third are Okawa's writings. Other authors have contributed as well. Okawa's wife, Kyoko, published books, mainly for the female audience. Some high-ranked disciples have produced titles. Others are published under the name of Happy Science or its Public Relations Department, which include books, magazines, comics, and textbooks.

Okawa is a prolific writer. By the early 1990s, he published about 20 to 30 books per year. He is said to have published over 300 books by 2004.

Many of Okawa's publications became best-sellers. Some of Okawa's books sold over a million copies. Okawa's main book The Laws of the Sun has sold the most copies, with ten million sold by January 2000. Happy Science said that by 1997, over 50 million copies of its titles were sold worldwide.

Unlike traditional religious text, Okawa's writings are very easy to read, with some parts being almost poetic. Okawa does not use old-fashioned, technical or complex language and avoids difficult kanji. He opts for the modern language, even using English loanwords. This simplicity may have helped give his books a popular appeal.

Rivalry with Aum Shinrikyo
Happy Science came into a bitter rivalry with the cult Aum Shinrikyo dating back to 1990, when Happy Science criticized the cult and its leader Shoko Asahara. Okawa called Asahara a frog, referring to Asahara's aquatic yogic acts. In response, Asahara criticized Okawa for not having undergone ascetic training and having a lack of doctrinal knowledge. In 1991, when Happy Science was going through heavy criticism from the public, academic , a critic of Happy Science, appeared to favor Aum Shinrikyo over Happy Science. Shimada favored Asahara because he went through ascetic training and had familiar knowledge of the doctrine of Buddhism. Okawa was criticized for having little knowledge of his own teachings and having faked his spiritual messages. He was challenged to prove his supernatural powers. Asahara published a book mocking Okawa's superficial knowledge of Buddhism. After the book's publication, Happy Science and Aum Shinrikyo were invited to a live television debate, but Okawa declined to participate. The hostility between the two groups culminated in an assassination attempt on Okawa by Aum Shinrikyo in February 1995. Aum members attempted to kill Okawa by putting the nerve agent VX in the air conditioning system of his car. The perpetrators did this by injecting the agent into the car's ventilation system with a needle-less syringe. The attempt failed for unknown reasons.

Happiness Realization Party

In September 2008, Okawa lectured at the New York branch of Happy Science, in which he talked about the political soft power of Happy Science:Happy Science is the most powerful and famous religion in Japan. I needed only 20 years to accomplish this. I was first asked for advice by Prime Minister Nakasone in 1988. Then we had Prime Minister Miyazawa who was a member of Happy Science, and after that, we produced a lot of Prime Ministers and Ministers. So I became one of the most influential kingmakers of Japan. The Japanese Prime Minister, Mr. Aso, visited Happy Science recently ... I gave him a strategy to become Japan's Prime Minister. He learned a lot and became the Prime Minister and came to New York to give a speech at the Assembly of the United Nations. It was based on just what I told him. So I am one of the kingmakers of Japan. I can choose a Japanese Prime Minister and I can have a Prime Minister quit in a month. It's a hidden secret of Japan ... Happy Science is the most influential power in Japan. So, if the American President cannot realize some diplomatic policy, he can just ask me and I can realize it in a week or so. It's a hidden secret. In Japan, religion has more power than politics.

A few months later, Okawa announced the founding of the Happiness Realization Party (HRP), the political wing of Happy Science. In April 2009, Okawa presented the party's . The party was founded in anticipation of the 2009 Japanese general election on 30 August 2009. The party is religious, conservative, and populist. The party does not make direct reference to the religious ideas of Happy Science.

Okawa's wife Kyoko became party leader on 4 June 2009. On 22 July, Okawa was appointed as president of the party. In that year's general election, the party fielded 337 candidates, including 75 women, in 288 out of the 300 constituencies in Japan. This number of candidates was rivalled only by the two major parties at the time, the Democratic Party of Japan and the Liberal Democratic Party. However, the party did not win any seats. It claimed to have just over one million votes, which is 1.4% of all votes cast, despite Happy Science having about ten million members. The party also unsuccessfully ran for the 2009 Sendai mayoral election. Kyoko stepped down as party leader and became head of the party's publicity department on 29 July before resigning from the party on 15 August. Okawa resigned as president on 12 September and a turnover of top party officials occurred.

In May 2010, the party gained its first seat in the House of Councillors when Yasuhiro Oe left the Democratic Party of Japan and joined HRP. On 21 April, Okawa was appointed honorary president of the party. A House of Councillors election was held in July, where no HRP candidates won. In December, Oe left HRP.

On 27 December 2012, Okawa was reappointed as president of the party.

Personal life
In April 1988, Okawa married , née , born on 22 August 1965. Kyoko had played a role as a spiritual leader alongside Okawa since 1987. Kyoko is a graduate of the University of Tokyo, where she studied English literature. Of his marriage with Kyoko, Okawa said it provided his life "with a stable basis that enabled me to concentrate even more on my task", and that it was "instrumental in the development of [Happy Science]". Kyoko became the Presidential Assistant of Happy Science in 1988, and the Head of Happy Science's women's group, called the "Society of Aphrodite". Like her husband, Kyoko has also published books for Happy Science, which mainly targeted the female audience. She also wrote an essay for each issue of Happy Science's monthly journal , which started in April 1987; she would address topics ranging from education to the family. Her essays were compiled into books. She was the joint president of the Happiness Realization party along with Okawa and later became the leader of the party. Okawa said that he and Kyoko were together in some of their past lives. The Society of Aphrodite and one of its subdivisions, are named after the Greek goddess and Florence Nightingale respectively because they are believed to be previous incarnations of Kyoko.

In February 2011, it was reported that Okawa and Kyoko had divorced. Happy Science announced that she had been permanently expelled for allegedly causing great personal and administrative damage to the organization, libeling the organization in various newspapers, and besmirching the name of Lord El Cantare.

Okawa and Kyoko had five children: eldest son  (born 24 February 1989), eldest daughter  (born 16 February 1991), second son  (born 1993), third son  (born 1995), and second daughter .

Hiroshi worked for Happy Science after graduating from university. However, he stopped working there because he felt he was not competent enough for the job. He then worked at a construction company for three years before returning to Happy Science in 2016. Since January 2016, he was president of Happy Science's entertainment agency. He was involved in film production and music, working as an actor and a singer. He was intended to be Okawa's successor as leader of Happy Science. In October 2018, he declared that he broke up with Happy Science on his personal YouTube channel. In an interview with Shūkan Bunshun on 28 February 2019, he said the reason is because at the end of January 2017, he felt pressured by his father to marry the actress Fumika Shimizu, who became a member of Happy Science in February. On 18 November, when he refused the marriage, his father became furious, and after that day, Hiroshi left Happy Science.  Happy Science has denied the accusation of Okawa pressuring Hiroshi to marry Fumika, saying that it was Hiroshi himself who was interested in marrying her. He has since renounced his father, stating "I believe what my father does is complete nonsense." He said that from an early age, he was taught that his father is a god. However, Hiroshi said he never thought of Okawa as a god and that he never wanted to follow in his father's footsteps nor has he ever wanted to do religious work.

Sayaka is said to be the managing director and general manager of Happy Science. In September 2015, she married , a member of the board of Happy Science. Happy Science has said that Sayaka would be the heir to the organization's leadership instead of Hiroshi. Masaki has been said to work for Happy Science since he was a student at university. He is serving as managing director and secretary general of science at Happy Science. In July 2016, he married , née , who serves as the chief of the president's office at Happy Science. Yuta works as director of Happy Science, general manager of the governor's office and staff officer for the promotion of the headquarters' government affairs. He has also published books for Happy Science.

In December 2012, Okawa married , née , born in 1985. She is believed by members of Happy Science to be the incarnation of the goddess Gaia.

Okawa had an aunt named  (1919 – 1994). She was a novelist. In 2012, Okawa delivered a Happy Science sermon about her in which Shizuko's spirit was speaking through Okawa.

Death
On 28 February 2023, Okawa was hospitalized after fainting at his home in Minato, Tokyo. He died on 2 March, at the age of 66.

See also
List of messiah claimants

References

Notes

Further reading

External links
 

1956 births
2023 deaths
Creator gods
Cult leaders
Deified Japanese people
Founders of new religious movements
Graduate Center, CUNY alumni
Happiness Realization Party politicians
Japanese political candidates
Japanese religious leaders
New religious movement deities
People from Tokushima Prefecture
Political party founders
Politicians from Tokushima Prefecture
Prophets
Savior gods
Self-declared messiahs
University of Tokyo alumni
Yoshinogawa, Tokushima
Spiritual mediums
Channellers